Trichocentrum andreanum is a species of orchid native to Mexico.

References 

andreanum
Flora of Mexico
Taxa named by Alfred Cogniaux